Belfast Yard is the maintenance, storage and administrative facility for LRT fleet for the Confederation Line of Ottawa's O-Train light rail system. The yard was opened in 2016 and assembled 34 Alstom Citadis Spirit LRT vehicles. The facility was expanded to accommodate 38 additional LRT vehicles as part of the Stage 2 Confederation Line expansion.

See also
Walkley Yard

References

External links

O-Train
2016 establishments in Ontario
National Capital Commission
OC Transpo
Railway depots in Canada
Transport infrastructure completed in 2016